is a Japanese gymnast, who competed in the 1964 Summer Olympics. He won two gold medals, in the vault and team combined exercises.

After marriage he changed his last name from Yamashita to Matsuda (松田), adopting his aunt's surname, who took care of him as a child. In 1961, he graduated from Nippon Sport Science University, where in 1983 he became professor and later professor emeritus. In the early 1970s he was an assistant gymnastics coach under Roger Council at the Indiana State University. There he began his research on biorhythms.

Yamashita also trained the national gymnastics team, at the 1976 Summer Olympics and at the Asian Games in 1990, and held senior positions with the Japan Gymnastics Association.

In 2000 Yamashita was inducted into the International Gymnastics Hall of Fame. He is an honorary citizen of his native town of Uwajima.

References

External links

 
 

1938 births
Living people
People from Uwajima, Ehime
Japanese male artistic gymnasts
Olympic gymnasts of Japan
Gymnasts at the 1964 Summer Olympics
Olympic gold medalists for Japan
Olympic medalists in gymnastics
Medalists at the World Artistic Gymnastics Championships
Originators of elements in artistic gymnastics
Nippon Sport Science University alumni
Medalists at the 1964 Summer Olympics
20th-century Japanese people
21st-century Japanese people